= Nari Bank railway station =

Railway station in Pakistan

Coordinates: 29.523033°N 67.797363°E

General information
- Owner: Ministry of Railways

Other information
- Station code: NRB

History
- Former names: Great Indian Peninsula Railway
Location

Nari Bank railway station (Urdu: ناری بنک ریلوے اسٹیشن) is located in Pakistan.

== See also ==
- List of railway stations in Pakistan
- Pakistan Railways
